Eric Brosius is a musician and video game developer, and a former employee of Looking Glass Studios. He is a former member of the band Tribe and is married to Terri Brosius. He is currently a member of the bands Eddie Japan and Dark Wheels.

Brosius is best known within the video game industry for his sound design and music work in several Looking Glass Studios, Irrational Games and Ion Storm games, particularly the Thief series. He and his wife still contribute to games made by Harmonix and Irrational.

He has contributed music and sound design for games including Terra Nova: Strike Force Centauri, System Shock 2 and the Thief series, along with Guitar Hero, SWAT 4 and Freedom Force vs. the Third Reich.

External links
 Tribe Interview
 
 

20th-century births
Year of birth missing (living people)
Living people
American male voice actors
Dark ambient musicians
Place of birth missing (living people)
Tribe (band) members
Video game composers